Junior Alberto Lacayo Rochez (born 19 August 1995 in La Ceiba, Honduras) is a Honduran football player who currently plays as a striker.

Club career

Club Deportivo Victoria

At the age of 16, Lacayo made his professional debut on July 29, 2012  against Motagua as a substitute for Rubén Licona. He was regarded by some people as heir to legendary Honduran striker Milton Tyson Núñez. In May 2013 Lacayo started a trial period with English Premier League side, West Ham United. In total, Lacayo scored nine goals in 23 appearances for Victoria.

International career
At the age of 17, Lacayo was called up by Luis Fernando Suárez to play against Panama and Canada in the FIFA World Cup qualifiers but did not play either games.

In 2013, Lacayo was called up again to play in the 2013 Copa Centroamericana and in the Central American Games but did not play either tournaments.

Lacayo was one of 20 players Honduras called up for the 2015 CONCACAF U-20 Championship.

Honours
Comunicaciones 
CONCACAF League: 2021

References

External links
 

1995 births
Living people
People from La Ceiba
Association football forwards
Honduran footballers
Honduran expatriate footballers
C.D. Victoria players
Liga Nacional de Fútbol Profesional de Honduras players
2013 Copa Centroamericana players
2015 CONCACAF U-20 Championship players
Expatriate footballers in Mexico
Central American Games gold medalists for Honduras
Central American Games medalists in football
Honduras international footballers
Honduras under-20 international footballers